The following is a list of charter schools in California (including networks of such schools) grouped by county.

Alameda County

 Academy of Alameda Middle School
 Achieve Academy
 AIMS College Prep Middle School/AIMS High School
 Alameda Community Learning Center
 Alternative in Action High School
 American Indian Public Charter School
 ARISE High School
 ASCEND Elementary
 Aspire Schools (Berkley Maynard, College Academy, Golden State Prep, Lionel Wilson Prep, Monarch, Triumph Technology)
 Aurum Preparatory Academy
 Bay Area Technology School
 Circle of Independent Learning
 Community School for Creative Education
 Connecting Waters Charter School (East Bay)
 Downtown Charter Academy
 East Bay Innovation Academy
 Education for Change Public Schools (6 schools)
 Envision Schools (3 schools)
 Francophone Charter School of Oakland
 Hayward Twin Oaks Montessori School
 KEY Academy Charter School
 KIPP (Bridge Academy, King Collegiate, Summit Academy)
 Leadership Public Schools, Hayward
 Lighthouse Community Public Schools
 Nea Community Learning Center
 North Oakland Community Charter School
 Oakland Charter Academy
 Oakland Charter High School
 Oakland Military Institute
 Oakland School for the Arts
 Opportunity Academy
 Oakland Unity Middle/High School
 Urban Montessori Charter School
 Yu Ming Charter School

Butte County

 Achieve Charter School (3 schools)
 Blue Oak Charter School
 Chico Country Day School
 Children's Community Charter School
 Come Back Butte Charter School
 CORE Butte Charter School
 Forest Ranch Charter School
 Hearthstone School
 HomeTech Charter School
 Inspire School of Arts & Sciences
 Ipkanni Early College Charter
 Paradise Charter Middle School
 Pivot Charter School (North Valley II)
 Sherwood Montessori School
 STREAM Charter School
 Wildflower Open Classroom

Contra Costa County

 Antioch Charter Academies (2 schools)
 Aspire Schools (Richmond Cal Prep, Richmond Tech Academy)
 Benito Juarez Elementary School
 Caliber: Beta Academy
 Clayton Valley Charter High School
 Contra Costa School of Performing Arts
 Eagle Peak Montessori School
 Golden Gate Community School
 Invictus Academy of Richmond
 John Henry High School
 Leadership Public Schools Richmond
 Making Waves Academy
 Manzanita Middle School
 Richmond Charter Academy (2 schools)
 Richmond College Prep School
 Rocketship Schools (Delta Prep, Futuro Academy)
 Summit Public School
 Vista Oaks Charter School
 Voices College-Bound Language Academies (West Contra Costa)

Del Norte County

 Castle Rock Charter School
 Uncharted Shores Academy

El Dorado County

 American River Charter School
 Buckeye Union Mandarin Immersion Charter School
 California Montessori Project (Shingle Springs)
 Camino Polytechnic
 Charter Alternative Program
 Charter Community School Home Study Academy
 Charter Montessori (Valley View)
 Clarksville Charter School
 The Cottonwood School
 EDUHSD Virtual Academy Shenandoah
 John Adams Academy (El Dorado Hills)
 Rising Sun Montessori School
 Rite of Passage

Fresno County

 Agape Schools (Carter G. Woodson, W.E.B DuBois School, W.E.B DuBois Academy)
 Alvina Elementary Charter School
 Aspen Public Schools (3 schools)
 Big Picture Educational Academy
 California Virtual Academy (Fresno)
 Career Technical Education Center
 Central Valley Home School
 Clovis Global Academy
 Clovis Online Charter School
 Edison-Bethune Charter Academy
 Endeavor Charter School
 Golden Charter Academy
 Hallmark Charter School
 Hume Lake Charter School
 Inspire Schools (Central)
 Island Community Day School
 Kepler Neighborhood School
 Kings Canyon Online School
 Kingsburg Elementary Charter School District
 Learn4Life (Ambassador Philip V. Sanchez II, Clovis, Crescent View South II, Crescent View West, Manchester Center, Sunnyside)
 Morris E. Dailey Charter Elementary School
 Quail Lake Environmental Charter School
 Rafer Johnson Junior High School
 Reedley Middle College High School
 Sanger Academy Charter School
 School of Unlimited Learning (Fresno EOC)
 Sierra Charter School
 University High School
 West Park Charter Academy
 Yosemite Valley Charter School

Glenn County

 Lake View Charter School
 Success One!
 Walden Academy
 William Finch Charter School

Humboldt County

 Agnes J. Johnson Charter School
 Alder Grove Charter School
 Coastal Grove Charter School
 Freshwater Charter Middle School
 Fuente Nueva Charter School
 Laurel Tree Charter School
 Northcoast Preparatory Academy
 Northern United Humboldt Charter School
 Pacific View Charter, California
 Redwood Preparatory Charter School
 Six Rivers Charter High School
 South Bay Charter School
 The Trillium Charter of Humboldt
 Union Street Charter School

Imperial County

 Ballington Academy of Arts & Sciences 
 Imperial Pathways Charter School
 The Imperial Valley Homeschool Academy

Inyo County

 College Bridge Academy
 The Education Corps
 YouthBuild Charter School (California Central)

Kern County

 Blue Ridge Academy
 California Virtual Academy (Maricopa)
 Cecil Avenue Math & Science Academy
 Del Vista Math & Science Academy
 EPIC de Cesar Chavez High School (North Region)
 Grimmway Academy
 GROW Academy (Arvin, Shafter)
 Heartland Charter School 
 Insight School of California
 Inspire Charter School (Kern)
 Kern Workforce 2000 Academy
 Nueva Vista Language Academy
 Peak to Peak Mountain Charter School
 Ridgecrest Elementary Academy for Language, Music & Science (REALMS)
 Valley Oaks Charter School
 Wonderful College Prep Academy

Kings County

 California Virtual Academy (Kings)
 Crossroads Charter School
 Hanford Online Charter School
 Learn4Life (Kings Valley Academy II)
 Lemoore Schools (3 schools)
 Mid Valley Alternative Charter School

Lake County

 California Connections Academy (North Bay) 
 Lake County International Charter School

Lassen County

 Long Valley School
 Mt. Lassen Charter School
 Thompson Peak Charter School

Los Angeles County

A-H

 Academia Avance Charter School
 Academia Moderna
 Academies of the Antelope Valley
 Alliance Schools (Collins Family, Margaret M. Bloomfield, Marine Innovation)
 Alma Fuerte Public School
 Alfred B. Noble Charter Middle School
 Animo (City of Champions, Inglewood, Leadership, Venice)
 Antelope Valley Learning Academy
 Ararat Charter School
 Aspire (Antonia Maria Lugo, Centennial, Firestone, Gateway, Junior Collegiate, Ollin, Pacific, Titan)
 Assurance Learning Academy
 Aveson (2 schools)
 Beckford Charter for Enriched Studies
 Bert Corona Charter School
 Birmingham High School
 Bridges Preparatory Academy
 Calabash Charter Academy
 California Pacific Charter School (Los Angeles)
 California School of the Arts (San Gabriel Valley)
 California Virtual Academy (Los Angeles)
 Calvert Charter for Enriched Studies
 Canyon Charter Elementary School
 Carpenter Community Charter School
 Castlebay Lane Charter School
 Century Community Charter School
 Charter HS of Arts-Multimedia & Performing (CHAMPS)
 Chatsworth Charter High School
 CHIME Institute's Schwarzenegger Community
 Citizens of the World Charter School (IV, V)
 City Honors International Preparatory High School
 Clear Passage Educational Center
 Colfax Charter Elementary School
 Compass Charter Schools of Los Angeles
 Da Vinci (Communications, Connect, Design, Rise, Science)
 Dearborn Elementary Charter Academy
 Desert Sands Charter School
 Discovery Charter Preparatory
 Dixie Canyon Community Charter School
 Eagle Collegiate Academy
 El Camino Real Charter High School
 El Oro Way Charter For Enriched Studies
 Enadia Way Technology Charter School
 Encino Charter Elementary School
 Environmental Charter School (Gardena HS, Gardena Middle, Inglewood, Lawndale)
 Empower Generations
 Family First Charter School
 Fenton (Avenue, Leadership, Primary, STEM)
 Gaspar De Portola Charter Middle School
 George Ellery Hale Charter Academy
 Girls Athletic Leadership School Los Angeles
 Gorman Learning Center
 Grace Hopper STEM Academy
 Granada Hills Charter School
 Grover Cleveland Charter High School
 Hamlin Charter Academy
 Hawthorne Math and Science Academy
 Haynes Charter For Enriched Studies
 Hesby Oaks Leadership Charter
 High Tech LA

I-P

 ICEF Inglewood Elementary Charter Academy
 iLead (Agua Dulce, Hybrid, Lancaster, Online)
 Ingenium Charter School
 iQ Academy Los Angeles
 ISANA (Achernar, Cardinal, Palmati)
 James Jordan Middle School
 Justice Street Academy Charter School
 KIPP (Comienza, Corazon, Pueblo Unido)
 Knollwood Preparatory Academy
 Intellectual Virtues Academy
 Ivy Academia
 Ivy Bound Academy of Math, Science, and Technology Charter Middle School I/II
 La Tijera K-8 Academy of Excellence Charter School
 La Verne Science and Technology Charter School
 Larchmont Charter School
 Lashon Academy I
 Learning Works
 Lennox Mathematics, Science & Technology Academy
 Life Source International Charter School
 Lifeline Education Charter School
 Lockhurst Drive Charter Elementary School
 Magnolia Science Academy (Bell, I, II, III, V, VII)
 Marquez Charter School
 Method Schools, LA
 Mission Academy
 Mission View Public School
 Montague Charter Academy
 Multicultural Learning Center
 Nestle Avenue Charter School
 N.E.W. Academy Canoga Park
 New Horizons Charter Academy
 New Millennium Secondary School
 New Opportunities Charter School
 North Valley Military Institute College Preparatory Academy
 Odyssey Charter School
 Opportunities for Learning (Baldwin Park, Duarte, Santa Clarita)
 Options for Youth (Acton, Duarte, San Gabriel)
 Our Community Charter School
 Pacoima Charter Elementary School
 Palisades Charter High School
 Palmdale Academy Charter School
 Palmdale Aerospace Academy
 Pasadena Rosebud Academy
 Plainview Academic Charter Academy
 Pomelo Community Charter School
 Port of Los Angeles High School
 PREPA TEC Los Angeles
 PUC Schools (Community Elementary/Middle/Early College, Inspire, Lakeview, Nueva Esperanza, Triumph)

R-Z

 Reseda Charter High School
 Riverside Drive Charter School
 Robert A. Millikan Affiliated Charter & Performing Arts Magnet Middle School
 Sage Oak Charter School Keppel
 San Jose Charter Academy
 Santa Clarita Valley International School
 Scholarship Prep School South Bay
 School of Arts and Enterprise
 School of Extended Educational Options
 Serrania Avenue Charter For Enriched Studies
 Sherman Oaks Elementary Charter School
 Soleil Academy Charter School
 Superior Street Elementary School
 Sylmar Charter High School
 T.I.M.E. Community School
 Taft Charter High School
 Topanga Elementary Charter School
 Topeka Charter School For Advanced Studies
 Valiente College Preparatory Charter School
 Valley Charter School
 Valor Academy
 Van Gogh Charter School
 Vaughn Next Century Learning Center
 Village Charter Academy
 We the People High School
 Welby Way Charter Elementary School/Gifted-High Ability Magnet School
 Wilbur Charter School For Enriched Academics
 Wilder's Preparatory Academy
 Woodlake Elementary Community Charter School
 Woodland Hills Elementary Charter For Enriched Studies

City of Los Angeles

 Academy of Media Arts
 Accelerated Schools
 Alain Leroy Locke College Preparatory Academy
 Alliance Schools (Cindy & Bill Simon, college-Ready Middle 4/8/12, Dr. Olga Mohan, Gertz-Ressler/Richard Merkin, Jack H. Skirball, Judy Ivie Burton, Kory Hunter, Leichtman-Levine, Marc & Eva Stern, Morgan McKinzie, Ouchi-O'Donovan, Patti & Peter Neuwirth, Piera Barbaglia Shaheen, Renee & Meyer Luskin, Susan & Eric Smidt, Ted K. Tajima, Tennenbaum Family, Virgil Roberts)
 Anahuacalmecac International University Preparatory
 Animo (Compton, Ellen Ochoa, Florence-Firestone, Jackie Robinson, James B. Taylor, Jefferson, Mae Jemison, Oscar de la Hoya, Pat Brown, Ralph Bunche, South LA, Watts, Western, Westside)
 APEX Academy
 Arts in Action Community Charter Schools
 Aspire (Inskeep, Juanita Tate, Slauson)
 Barack Obama Charter School
 Bright Star Secondary Charter Academy
 Calliope Academy
 Camino Nuevo Charter Academy (6 schools)
 CATCH Prep Charter High School
 Center for Advanced Learning
 Central City Value School
 Citizens of the World Charter School (Hollywood, Mar Vista, Silver Lake)
 City Charter Schools
 Collegiate Charter High School of Los Angeles
 Community Magnet Charter Elementary School
 Crete Academy
 Crown Preparatory Academy
 Downtown Value School
 Dr. Theodore T. Alexander Jr. Science Center
 Ednovate (Brio, East, Esperanza, USC Hybrid, South LA)
 El Rio Community School
 Emerson Community Charter School
 Equitas Academy (6 schools)
 Everest Value School
 Extera Public School
 Gabriella Charter School
 Global Education Academy
 Goethe International Charter School
 ICEF (Innovation LA, View Park, Vista)
 Ingenium Charter School (Clarion)
 Invictus Leadership Academy
 ISANA (Himalia, Nascent, Octavia)
 Jardin de la Infancia
 Kenter Canyon Elementary Charter School
 KIPP (Compton, Empower, Endeavor, Ignite, Iluminar, Innovation, LA Prep, Opportunity, Philosophers, Poder, Promesa, Raices, Scholar, Sol, Vida)
 Lashon Academy City
 Learning by Design Charter School
 Libertas College Preparatory Charter School
 Los Angeles Academy of Arts and Enterprise
 Los Angeles College Prep Academy
 Los Angeles Leadership Academy
 Los Feliz Charter School for the Arts
 Magnolia Science Academy (IV, VI)
 Math and Science College Preparatory School
 Matrix for Success Academy
 Monsenor Oscar Romero Charter Middle School
 N.E.W. Academy of Science and Arts
 New Designs Charter School
 New Heights Charter School
 New Los Angeles Charter School
 New Village Girls Academy
 New West Charter School
 Ocean Charter School
 Open Charter Magnet School
 Para Los Niños Charter School
 Paul Revere Charter Middle School
 PUC Schools (CALS, eCALS, Excel, Milagro)
 Puente Charter School
 Renaissance Arts Academy
 Resolute Academy Charter School
 Rise Kohyang 
 Russell Westbrook Why Not? School
 Santa Monica Boulevard Community Charter School
 SEED School of Los Angeles County
 SIATech Academy South
 Stella Charter Academy
 STEM Preparatory Elementary School
 Synergy (Charter, Kinetic, Quantum)
 TEACH (Academy of Technologies, Preparatory Mildred S. Cunningham & Edith H. Morris Elementary, Tech Charter High)
 Today's Fresh Start Compton
 University High School Charter
 University Preparatory Value High School
 Vista Charter Middle School
 Vista Horizon Global Academy
 Vox Collegiate School of Los Angeles
 Wallis Annenberg High School
 Watts Learning Center
 Westwood Charter Elementary School
 WISH Academy

Madera County

 Chawanakee Academy Charter School
 Ezequiel Tafoya Alvarado Academy
 Glacier High School Charter 
 Learn4Life (Crescent View South II)
 Madera County Independent Academy
 Minarets Charter High School
 Mountain Home School Charter
 Pioneer Technical Center
 Sherman Thomas Charter School/STEM Academy
 Yosemite-Wawona Elementary Charter School

Marin County

 Novato Charter School
 Phoenix Academy
 Ross Valley Charter School

Mariposa County
 Sierra Foothill Charter School

Mendocino County

 Accelerated Achievement Academy
 Eel River Charter School
 La Vida Charter School
 Pacific Community Charter School
 Redwood Academy of Ukiah
 River Oak Charter School
 Shanel Valley Academy
 Three Rivers Charter School
 Tree of Life International Charter School
 Willits Charter School

Merced County

 Ballico-Cressey Community Charter School
 Come Back Charter School
 Merced Scholars Charter School

Mono County
 Urban Corps of San Diego County Charter School

Monterey County

 Bay View Academy
 Big Sur Charter School
 International School of Monterey
 Learning for Life Charter School
 Monterey Bay Charter School
 Monterey County Home Charter School
 Oasis Charter Public School
 Open Door Charter School

Napa County
 Stone Bridge School

Nevada County

 Arete Charter Academy
 Bitney Prep High School
 Chicago Park Community Charter School
 Forest Charter School
 Grass Valley Charter School
 John Muir Charter School
 Nevada City School of the Arts
 Sierra Academy of Expeditionary Learning
 Twin Ridges Home Study Charter School
 Vantage Point Charter School
 Yuba River Charter School

Orange County

 Advanced Learning Academy
 California Connections Academy (Southern California)
 Citrus Springs Charter School
 College and Career Preparatory Academy
 Community Roots Academy
 Ednovate (Legacy)
 Edward B. Cole, Sr. Academy
 El Rancho Charter School
 El Sol Santa Ana Science and Arts Academy
 EPIC Charter School
 International School for Science and Culture
 Irvine International Academy
 Journey School
 Kinetic Academy Huntington
 Magnolia Science Academy (Santa Ana)
 NOVA Academy Early College High School (Santa Ana)
 Opportunities for Learning (San Juan Capistrano)
 Orange County Academy of Sciences and Arts
 Orange County Classical Academy
 Orange County Educational Arts Academy
 Orange County School of the Arts
 Orange County Workforce Innovation High School
 Oxford Preparatory Academy (Saddleback Valley, South Orange County)
 Palm Lane Charter 
 Samueli Academy
 Scholarship Prep
 Suncoast Prep Academy
 Sycamore Creek Community Charter School
 The Nelson Mandela Charter of La Habra (formerly Gardez UCI School)
 Tomorrow's Leadership Collaborative (TLC) Charter School
 Unity Middle College High School
 Vibrant Minds Charter School
 Vista Charter Public Schools (Condor Global, Heritage Global, Meridian Global)

Placer County

 Alta Vista Community Charter School
 Bowman Charter School
 Creekside Charter School
 Golden Valley Tahoe School
 Harvest Ridge Cooperative Charter School
 Horizon Charter Schools
 John Adams Academy (Lincoln, Roseville)
 Loomis Basin Charter School
 Maidu Virtual Charter Academy
 Maria Montessori Charter Academy
 Newcastle Charter School
 Placer Academy Charter School
 Placer County Pathways Charter School
 Rocklin Academy (Gateway, Meyers St., Turnstone)
 Sierra Expeditionary Learning
 Western Sierra Collegiate Academy

Plumas County
 Plumas Charter School

Riverside County

 Audeo Valley Charter School
 California Military Academy
 Cielo Vista Charter School
 Come Back Kids
 Excelsior Charter School (Corona)
 Garvey / Allen Visual Performing Arts Academy for STEM
 Gateway College and Career Academy
 George Washington Charter School
 Highland Academy
 Imagine Schools (Coachella, Hemet)
 The Journey School
 Julia Lee Performing Arts Academy
 Julian Charter School (Pine Hills)
 Leadership Military Academy
 Learn4Life (Vista Norte)
 Mission Vista Academy
 NOVA Academy Early College High School (Coachella)
 Nuview Bridge Early College High School
 Palm Desert Charter Middle School
 Pivot Charter School, Riverside
 REACH Leadership STEAM Academy
 River Springs Charter School
 San Jacinto Valley Academy
 Santa Rosa Academy
 SCALE Leadership Academy East
 Springs Charter School (Casa Montessori, Classical, Corona Student Center, Da Vinci, Del Rio, Flabob Airport, Hemet Quest, i-Shine)Magnolia, Palm, Rancho Cucamonga, Renaissance Real World, Renaissance Valley)
 Sycamore Academy of Science and Cultural Arts 
 Temecula International Academy
 Temecula Preparatory School
 Temecula Valley Charter School
 Western Center Academy
 YouthBuild Charter School (Moreno Valley)

Sacramento County

 Alpha Charter School
 American River Collegiate Academy
 Aspire Schools (Alexander Twilight College Prep, Alexander Twilight Secondary, Capitol Heights)
 California Innovative Career Academy
 California Montessori Project (Capitol, Elk Grove, San Juan)
 Capitol Collegiate Academy
 Community Collaborative Charter School
 Community Outreach Academy Elementary
 Creative Connections Arts Academy
 Delta Elementary Charter School
 Elk Grove Charter School
 Folsom Cordova K-8 Community Charter School
 Fortune School of Education
 Futures High School
 Gateway Community Charter Schools (9 schools)
 Gateway International School
 George Washington Carver School of Arts and Science
 Golden Valley Schools (Orchard, River)
 Growth Public School
 Heritage Peak Charter School
 Higher Learning Academy
 Highlands Community Charter and Technical Schools
 Language Academy of Sacramento
 Leroy Greene Academy
 Learn4Life (Marconi Learning Academy)
 Met Sacramento
 Natomas Charter School
 New Hope Charter School
 New Joseph Bonnheim (NJB) Community Charter School
 New Technology High School
 Options for Youth (San Juan)
 Paseo Grande Charter School
 Sacramento Charter High School
 Sacramento Academic and Vocational Academy (SAVA)
 San Juan Choices Charter School
 Smythe Academy of Arts and Sciences
 Sol Aureus College Preparatory 
 St. Hope Public Schools
 Visions in Education
 Westlake Charter School
 Westside Preparatory Charter School
 Yav Pem Suab Academy

San Benito County
 Hollister Prep School

San Bernardino County

 Academy for Academic Excellence
 Academy of Careers and Exploration
 Allegiance STEAM Academy
 ASA Charter School
 Ballington Academy for the Arts and Sciences (San Bernardino)
 Competitive Edge Charter Academy (CECA)
 Desert Trails Preparatory Academy
 Elite Academic Academy (Lucerne)
 Empire Springs Charter School
 Encore Jr./Sr. High School for the Performing and Visual Arts
 Entrepreneur High School
 Excel Academy Charter School
 Excel Prep Charter School
 Excelsior Charter School (Barstow, Corona, North Victorville, Ontario, Phelan, Redlands, San Bernardino, Victorville)
 Gorman Learning Center (San Bernardino/Santa Clarita)
 Granite Mountain Charter School
 Grove Charter School
 Hardy Brown College Prep School
 Independence Charter Academy
 Inland Leaders Charter School
 LaVerne Elementary Preparatory Academy
 Learn4Life (Alta Vista Innovation High, Antelope Valley Learning Academy, AV Learning Academy)
 Mirus Secondary School
 Mojave River Academy (Gold Canyon, Marble City, National Trails, Oro Grande, Rockview Park, Route 66, Silver Mountain)
 Mountain View Montessori Charter School
 New Vision Middle School
 Norton Science and Language Academy
 Options for Youth (Victorville, San Bernardino)
 Pathways to College
 Provisional Accelerated Learning Academy
 Public Safety Academy
 Riverside Preparatory School
 Sage Oak Charter School
 Savant Preparatory Academy of Business
 Sixth Street Prep School
 Sky Mountain Charter School
 SOAR Charter Academy
 Summit Leadership Academy (High Desert)
 Sycamore Academy of Science and Cultural Arts (Chino Valley)
 Taylion High Desert Academy
 Virtual Preparatory Academy at Lucerne
 Vista Norte Public Charter
 Woodward Leadership Academy
 YouthBuild Charter School (San Bernardino)

San Diego County

 All Tribes Charter School
 Arroyo Vista Charter School
 Audeo Charter School II/III
 Barona Indian Charter School
 Baypoint Preparatory Academy (San Diego)
 Bella Mente Montessori Academy
 Bostonia Global School
 Brookfield Engineering Science Technology Academy
 Cabrillo Point Academy
 California Pacific Charter School (San Diego)
 California Virtual Academy (San Diego)
 Chula Vista Learning Community Charter School
 Classical Academy High School
 Coastal Academy Charter School
 College Preparatory Middle School
 Community Montessori School
 Compass Charter Schools of San Diego
 Dimensions Collaborative
 Discovery Charter School
 Dual Language Immersion North County
 EJE Charter School
 Elite Academic Academy (Mountain Empire)
 Escondido Charter High School
 Excel Academy Charter School
 Feaster (Mae L.) Charter School
 Greater San Diego Academy
 Grossmont Secondary School
 Guajome Learning Center
 Guajome Park Academy
 Harbor Springs Charter School
 Hawking S.T.E.A.M. Charter School
 The Heights Charter School
 Helix High School
 Heritage K-8 Charter School
 High Tech Elementary Chula Vista
 High Tech Elementary Explorer
 High Tech High International 
 High Tech Media Arts
 High Tech Mesa
 High Tech North County
 Howard Gardner Community Charter School
 Imperial Beach Charter School
 Insight School San Diego
 Integrity Charter School
 Julian Charter School (Cedar Cove, Manzanita, Mountain Oaks, Pine Valley)
 Kidinnu Academy
 Learning Choice Academy (East County)
 Leonardo da Vinci Health Sciences Charter School
 Literacy First Charter School
 MAAC Community Charter School
 Methodschools
 Motivated Youth Academy
 Mueller (Robert L.) Charter School
 North County Trade Tech High School
 Pacific Coast Academy 
 Pacific Springs Charter School
 Pacific View Charter School
 Pivot Charter School (San Diego)
 The Preuss School UCSD
 Sage Oak Charter School (South)
 San Diego Workforce Innovation High School
 Scholarship Prep (Oceanside)
 SIATech
 Sparrow Academy
 Steele Canyon High School
 Sweetwater Secondary School
 Vista Springs Charter School
 Vivian Banks Charter School

City of San Diego

 Albert Einstein Academies
 America's Finest Charter School
 Audeo Charter School I
 Charter School of San Diego
 City Heights Preparatory Charter School
 Darnall Charter School
 E3 Civic High School
 Elevate Elementary School
 Empower Language Academy
 Gompers Preparatory Academy
 Harriet Tubman Village Charter School
 Health Sciences High School
 Holly Drive Leadership Academy
 Iftin Charter School
 Ingenuity Charter School
 Innovations Academy
 Kavod Charter School
 Keiller Leadership Academy
 King-Chavez Academy (Arts, Community, Excellence, Prep, Primary)
 KIPP Adelante Preparatory Academy
 Learn4Life (Diego Hills Central, Diego Valley East, Innovation High San Diego)
 Magnolia Science Academy (San Diego)
 McGill School of Success
 Museum School
 Nestor Language Academy Charter School
 Old Town Academy K-8 Charter School
 River Valley Charter School
 San Diego Cooperative Charter School
 San Diego Mission Academy
 San Diego Virtual School
 School for Entrepreneurship and Technology
 SD Global Vision Academy
 The O'Farrell Charter Schools
 Urban Discovery Academy Charter School

San Francisco County

 City Arts and Tech High School
 Creative Arts Charter School
 Five Keys Charter School/Independence HS
 Gateway High School
 KIPP (Bayview, San Francisco Bay, San Francisco College Prep)
 Leadership High School
 Life Learning Academy Charter School
 Mission Preparatory School
 The New School of San Francisco
 Thomas Edison Charter Academy

San Joaquin County

 Aspire Schools (APEX, Arts & Sciences, Benjamin Holt College Prep, Benjamin Holt Middle, Langston Hughes, Port City, River Oaks Charter, Rosa Parks, Stockton Secondary, Vincent Shalvey)
 Banta Charter School
 California Connections Academy (North Bay, Ripon)
 California Virtual Academy (San Joaquin)
 Delta Charter School (Bridges, Home, Keys, Online)
 Discovery Charter School
 Dr. Lewis Dolphin Stallworth Sr. Charter School
 EPIC Academy
 Escalon Charter Academy
 Health Careers Academy
 Humphreys College Academy of Business, Law and Education
 Insight School (San Joaquin)
 Joe Serna Jr. Charter School
 John McCandless Charter School
 KIPP Stockton
 Millennium Charter School
 New Jerusalem Elementary School
 NextGeneration STEAM Academy
 Nightingale Charter School
 one.Charter Elementary Academy
 Pacific Law Academy
 Pittman Charter School
 Primary Charter School
 Rio Valley Charter School
 River Islands Technology Academy II
 Stockton Collegiate International Schools
 Stockton Early College Academy
 TEAM Charter School
 Tracy Learning Center
 Valley View Charter Prep School
 Venture Academy
 Voices College-Bound Language Academies (Stockton)

San Luis Obispo County

 Almond Acres Charter Academy
 Bellevue-Santa Fe Charter School
 Grizzly ChalleNGe Charter School

San Mateo County

 Aspire Schools (East Palo Alto Charter)
 California Virtual Academy (San Mateo)
 Connect Community Charter School
 Design Tech High School
 East Palo Alto Academy
 Everest Public High School
 KIPP (Esperanza, Excelencia, Valiant)
 Oxford Day Academy
 Rocketship Public Schools (Redwood City Prep)
 San Carlos Charter Learning Center
 Summit Preparatory Charter High School
 Summit Public School: Shasta

Santa Barbara County

 Adelante Charter School
 California Connections Academy (Central Coast)
 Family Partnership Charter School
 Manzanita Public Charter School
 Olive Grove Charter School (Buellton, Lompoc, Orcutt, Santa Barbara)
 Orcutt Academy Charter School
 Peabody Charter School
 Santa Barbara Charter School
 Santa Ynez Valley Charter School
 Trivium Charter School (Adventure, Voyage)

Santa Clara County

 ACE Charter Schools (Charter High, Empower, Esperanza, Inspire)
 Alpha Charter Schools (Blanca Alvarado, Cindy Avitia, Cornerstone, Jose Hernandez)
 Aptitud Community Academy at Goss
 B. Roberto Cruz Leadership Academy
 Bullis Charter School
 Campbell School of Innovation
 Charter School of Morgan Hill
 Discovery Charter School I/II
 DCP El Primero High School
 Farnham Charter School
 Gilroy Early College Academy
 Ida Jew Academies
 KIPP (Heartwood, Heritage, Navigate, Prize, San Jose Collegiate)
 Latino College Preparatory Academy
 Luis Valdez Leadership Academy
 Metropolitan Education District
 Opportunity Youth Academy
 Perseverance Preparatory School
 Price Charter Middle School
 Rocketship Public Schools (Alma, Brilliant Minds, Discovery Prep, Fuerza Community Prep, Los Sueños, Mateo Sheedy, Mosaic, Rising Stars, Sí Se Puede, Spark)
 San Jose Conservation Corps Charter School
 Sartorette Charter School
 Summit Public School (Denali, Tahoma)
 University Preparatory Charter Academy
 Voices College-Bound Language Academies (Franklin-McKinley, Morgan Hill, Mount Pleasant)

Santa Cruz County

 Alianza Charter School
 California Connections Academy (Monterey Bay)
 Ceiba College Preparatory Academy
 Delta Charter School
 Diamond Technology Institute
 Linscott Charter School
 Ocean Grove Charter School
 Pacific Coast Charter School
 Pacific Collegiate School
 Santa Cruz County Career Advancement Center
 SLVUSD Charter School
 Tierra Pacifica Charter School
 Watsonville Charter School of the Arts
 Watsonville Prep School

Shasta County

 Anderson New Technology High School
 Chrysalis Charter School
 Cottonwood Creek Charter School
 Monarch Learning Center
 Northern Summit Academy Shasta
 PACE Academy Charter School
 Phoenix Charter Academy
 Redding Collegiate Academy
 Redding School of the Arts
 Redding STEM Academy
 Rocky Point Charter School
 Shasta Charter Academy
 Shasta View Academy
 Stellar Charter School
 Tree of Life International Charter School
 University Preparatory School

Siskiyou County

 Golden Eagle Charter School
 Northern United Siskiyou Charter School

Solano County

 Buckingham Charter Magnet High School
 Caliber: ChangeMakers Academy
 Dixon Montessori Charter School
 Elite Public School
 Ernest Kimme Charter Academy for Independent Learning
 Fairmont Charter Elementary School
 Griffin Academy High School
 Kairos Public School Vacaville Academy
 Mare Island Technology Academy
 MIT Academy
 Vallejo Charter School

Sonoma County

 Binkley Elementary Charter School
 Cali Calmecac Language Academy
 California Pacific Charter School (Sonoma)
 California Virtual Academy (Sonoma)
 Cesar Chavez Language Academy
 Cinnabar Charter School
 Dunham Charter School
 Forestville Academy
 Heartwood Charter School
 Kid Street Learning Center Charter
 Liberty Independent Study School
 Live Oak Charter School
 Loma Vista Immersion Academy
 Mark West Charter School
 Mary Collins Charter School at Cherry Valley
 Miwok Valley Elementary Charter School
 Morrice Schaefer Charter School
 Northwest Prep Charter School
 Old Adobe Elementary Charter School
 Olivet Elementary Charter School
 Orchard View School
 Pathways Charter School
 Petaluma Accelerated Charter
 Piner-Olivet Charter
 Pivot Charter School (North Bay)
 Rincon Valley Charter School
 River Montessori Elementary Charter School
 Roseland Charter School
 Salmon Creek School - A Charter
 Santa Rosa Accelerated Charter School
 Santa Rosa Charter School for the Arts
 Santa Rosa French-American Charter School (SRFACS)
 Sebastopol Independent Charter School
 Sonoma Charter School
 Spring Creek Matanzas Charter School
 SunRidge Charter School
 Twin Hills Charter Middle School
 Village Charter School
 Whited Elementary Charter School
 Woodland Star Charter School
 Wright Charter School

Stanislaus County

 Aspire Schools (Summit Charter, University Charter, Vanguard College Prep)
 Connecting Waters Charter School
 Denair Charter Academy
 eCademy Charter at Crane
 Fusion Charter School
 Gratton Charter School
 Great Valley Academy
 Hart-Ransom Academic Charter School
 Hickman Community Charter School District
 Independence Charter School
 Keyes to Learning Charter School
 Oakdale Charter School
 Paradise Charter School
 Riverbank Language Academy
 Roberts Ferry Charter School Academy
 Shiloh Charter School
 Stanislaus Alternative Charter School
 Valley College High School
 Whitmore Charter School of Art & Technology

Sutter County

 AeroSTEM Academy
 California Virtual Academy (Sutter)
 Feather River Charter School
 Pathways Charter Academy
 South Sutter Charter School
 Sutter Peak Charter Academy
 Twin Rivers Charter School
 Winship Community School
 Yuba City Charter School

Tehama County

 Evergreen Institute of Excellence
 Lassen-Antelope Volcanic Academy (LAVA)
 Lincoln Street School
 Tehama eLearning Academy

Trinity County
 California Heritage Youthbuild Academy II

Tulare County

 Accelerated Charter High School
 Blue Oak Academy 
 Butterfield Charter School
 California Connections Academy (Central Valley)
 Charter Home School Academy
 Eleanor Roosevelt Community Learning Center
 Global Learning Charter
 Harmony Magnet Academy
 Learn4Life (Crescent Valley Public Charter II)
 Loma Vista Charter School
 Monarch River Academy
 Porterville Military Academy
 Sequoia Elementary Charter School
 Sierra Vista Charter High School
 Summit Charter Academy
 Sycamore Valley Academy
 University Preparatory High School
 Valley Life Charter School
 Visalia Charter Independent Study
 Visalia Technical Early College

Tuolomne County

 Connections Visual and Performing Arts Academy
 Gold Rush Charter School

Ventura County

 Architecture, Construction & Engineering Charter High School (ACE)
 BRIDGES Charter School
 Camarillo Academy of Progressive Education
 Golden Valley Charter School
 IvyTech Charter School
 Learn4Life (Vista Real Charter High Camarillo, VRCHS Oxnard, VRCHS Port Hueneme, VRCHS Santa Paula, VRCHS Simi Valley, VRCHS Ventura Telegraph)
 Meadows Arts and Technology Elementary School
 Opportunities for Learning (Simi Valley)
 Peak Prep Pleasant Valley
 River Oaks Academy
 University Preparation Charter School at CSU Channel Islands
 Valley Oak Charter School
 Ventura Charter School of Arts and Global Education

Yolo County

 Compass Charter School (Yolo)
 Da Vinci Charter Academy
 Empowering Possibilities International Charter School
 River Charter Schools Lighthouse Charter School
 Sacramento Valley Charter School
 Science & Technology Academy at Knights Landing
 Washington Middle College High School

Yuba County

 CORE Charter School
 Marysville Charter Academy for the Arts
 Paragon Collegiate Academy
 Wheatland Charter Academy
 Yuba County Career Preparatory Charter School
 Yuba Environmental Science Charter Academy

References

Charter